The 1902 U.S. Open was the eighth U.S. Open, held October 10–11 at Garden City Golf Club in Garden City, New York, on Long Island, east of New York City. Laurie Auchterlonie established a new 72-hole U.S. Open scoring record to win his only major title, six strokes ahead of Stewart Gardner and amateur Walter Travis.

Auchterlonie posted rounds of 78-78-74-77 and became the first in U.S. Open history to card four sub-80 rounds. His 307 total was six shots better than the previous championship record, set by Harry Vardon in 1900.

Clear skies greeted the field on Friday for the first two rounds. The weather worsened on Saturday, with cloudy skies in the morning and a pouring rain in the afternoon.  The adverse playing conditions didn't seen to affect the scoring; in fact many players played well in the final round in the rain. John Shippen, playing out of Marine Field Club in New York, became the first American-born player to finish in the money in a U.S. Open.

The improvement in scores were in large part due to the introduction of the Haskell golf ball, which soon replaced the gutta-percha ball as the prominent golf ball in use.

Past champions in the field 

Source:

Did not play: Harry Vardon (1900), Joe Lloyd (1897).

Round summaries

First round
Friday, October 10, 1902 (morning)

Source:

Second round
Friday, October 10, 1902 (afternoon)

Source:

Third round
Saturday, October 11, 1902 (morning)

Source:

Final round
Saturday, October 11, 1902 (afternoon)

Source:

Amateurs: Travis (313), Murphy (341), Watson (345), Livingston (348), Seeley (353),Lockwood (356), Macdonald (357), Croker (360).

References

External links
USGA Championship Database

U.S. Open (golf)
Golf in New York (state)
Sports in Long Island
U.S. Open (golf)
U.S. Open (golf)
U.S. Open golf
October 1902 sports events